The list of shipwrecks in April 1831 includes ships sunk, foundered, grounded, or otherwise lost during April 1831.

1 April

2 April

8 April

10 April

12 April

13 April

14 April

15 April

18 April

19 April

21 April

22 April

25 April

30 April

Unknown date

References

1831-04